The 2016–17 Florida Gulf Coast Eagles men's basketball team represented Florida Gulf Coast University (FGCU) in the 2016–17 NCAA Division I men's basketball season. FGCU played their home games at Alico Arena in Fort Myers, Florida and were led by fourth-year head coach Joe Dooley as members of the Atlantic Sun Conference. They finished the regular season 26–8, 12–2 in ASUN play to win the regular season championship. As the No. 1 seed in the ASUN tournament, they defeated Stetson, Kennesaw State, and North Florida to win the tournament championship. As a result, they received the conference's automatic bid to the NCAA tournament where they lost in the first round to Florida State.

Previous season 
The Eagles finished the 2015–16 season 21–14, 8–6 in A-Sun play to finish in a three-way tie for second place. They defeated Kennesaw State, North Florida, and Stetson to win the A-Sun tournament. As a result, they received the conference's automatic bid to the NCAA tournament as a No. 16 seed where they defeated fellow No. 16 seed Fairleigh Dickinson in the First Four. The Eagles advanced to the First Round where they lost to No. 1 seed North Carolina.

Preseason
Departures

Arrivals

Class of 2016 Signees

Roster

Schedule and results 

|-
!colspan=9 style=| Non-conference regular season

|-
!colspan=9 style=| Atlantic Sun Conference regular season

|-
!colspan=12 style=| Atlantic Sun tournament

|-
!colspan=12 style=| NCAA tournament

References

Florida Gulf Coast Eagles men's basketball seasons
Florida Gulf Coast
Florida Gulf Coast